Bo Min Gaung is a prominent 20th century weizza, or wizard, who lived in Myanmar near Mount Popa. He is associated with Dhammazedi, a prominent king of the Hanthawaddy Kingdom of ancient Myanmar in the 15th century.

History
The history of Bo Min Gaung is unclear. He is said to have lived in the 20th century was successful around 1950 near Mount Popa. He is believed to be born near Mount Popa and lived and practiced meditation and won his success upon occultism there.

The Dhammazedi Gaing consider him as their founder and master, as well as the future Buddha or a future king. However, this is not a standard belief in mainstream Burmese Buddhism. In addition to believing that he will be reincarnated as a powerful leader in the future, the Dhammazedi Gaing also believe that he inhabits the bodies of living persons, whose bodies he speaks through and advises his followers on how to live a Buddhist life. Thus, he is considered as an immortal in traditional Burmese Buddhism and his statues are often featured on Burmese altars.

Family members with people
Bo Min Gaung, also known as Aba Bo Min Gaung, had been accepted by most people as a family member. For older than 40 years old, he is their Aba (means Father, and also Father's brother or term to call peer age with Father or Dad.). For young age between 1 to over 30, he is their grand, grand aba, granddad, and protector. Mostly founded in villages of Myanmar (Burma). And also people in other states or territories, they known him as a powerful soul or human, but mostly accepted as a relative.

Respect from people
People, they also respect to Aba Bo Min Gaung, who gain success in meditation(Burmese :၀ိပသနာ). All People bow to him for giving respect to him.

Relation with Buddha
Aba Bo Min Gaung is also Buddhist which official religion of Myanmar (Burma). He really believe in Buddha, and Buddha's Dhammas. His ambition is to be a part of Buddhist, and Listen or follow Buddha's Dhammas when upcoming Buddha appear again in future.

Burmese nationalist movement
Bo Min Gaung is associated with the Burmese nationalist movement.

Powers
Most people in Burma believe that he can protect them, give dreams to them, and even give money or wealth by using his powers otherwise, by using his soul.

References

Bibliography

External links 
Who are Weizzars and their path in Buddhism?

Burmese folk religion
Weizzas
20th-century Burmese people